Kym Kinnear is a former Australian rules footballer who played for the Port Adelaide Football Club in the South Australian National Football League (SANFL), in his time with Port Adelaide, he won three premierships.

References

Port Adelaide Football Club (SANFL) players
Port Adelaide Football Club players (all competitions)
Year of birth missing (living people)
Living people
Australian rules footballers from South Australia